The Panoz DP09 (commonly known as the Superleague DP09) was the sole spec open-wheel race car used in the Superleague Formula series. It was produced by Élan Motorsport Technologies at Braselton, Georgia, in the United States. The DP09 was based on the 2007 Panoz DP01 Champ Cars, while in 2009 the cars were updated to become the DP09B. Since the series' closure midway through 2011, DP09Bs have seen limited use in the BOSS GP Series. Panoz and Èlan engineers developed the Panoz DP09 to be the exclusive chassis for Europe’s new Superleague Formula series that began in 2008.

The DP09 featured a 750-horsepower 4.2-liter V12 engine designed by Menard Competition Technologies.  It also featured underbody aerodynamics, a Hewland six-speed semi-automatic gearbox, and weighed about 1,650 lbs. The DP09 race cars also were sans traction control, launch control, and anti-stall technologies, making performance dependent on driver skill and the team set up.

References

DP09
Superleague Formula
Open wheel racing cars